Prabhat Gurung (born 14 July 2004) is a Nepalese-born Hong Kong professional footballer who currently plays as a midfielder for Hong Kong Premier League club Eastern.

Club career
Having joined Eastern at the age of fourteen, Gurung signed his first professional contract in July 2022.

International career
On 28 October 2022, Gurung officially announced that he had received a Hong Kong passport after giving up his Nepalese passport, making him eligible to represent Hong Kong internationally.

Career statistics

Club

Notes

References

External links
 Prabhat Gurung at the HKFA

2004 births
Living people
Nepalese footballers
Hong Kong footballers
Association football midfielders
Hong Kong Premier League players
Eastern Sports Club footballers
Nepalese expatriate footballers
Expatriate footballers in Hong Kong